Vincent Mullins (born 1959) is an Irish former hurler.  At club level he played with St. Mary's Clonmel and was also a member of the Tipperary senior hurling team. He usually lined out as a goalkeeper.

Career

Mullins played juvenile and underage hurling with the St. Mary's club in Clonmel. He was just 16-years-old when he lined out with the St. Mary's team that won the County Junior Championship title in 1975, before later winning a South Tipperary Senior Championship title in 1981. Mullins's performances for the club brought him to the attention of the Tipperary minor team selectors and he lined out in goal for their All-Ireland Minor Championship success in 1976. He progressed onto the Tipperary under-21 team and won consecutive All-Ireland Under-21 Championship titles from 1979 and 1980. Mullins lined out as sub-goalkeeper with the Tipperary senior hurling team for one season.

Honours

St. Mary's Clonmel
South Tipperary Senior Hurling Championship: 1981
Tipperary Junior A Hurling Championship: 1975

Tipperary
All-Ireland Under-21 Hurling Championship: 1979, 1980
Munster Under-21 Hurling Championship: 1978, 1979, 1980
All-Ireland Minor Hurling Championship: 1976
Munster Minor Hurling Championship: 1976

References

External link

 Vincent Mullins profile on Tipp GAA Archives website

1959 births
Living people
Hurling goalkeepers
St Mary's (Tipperary) hurlers
Tipperary inter-county hurlers